The Japanese Class 7170 steam locomotive was among the first trains to be used in Hokkaido, and was utilized alongside the JNR Class 7100 on the Horonai Railway. 

The two tender locomotives that were to become the Class 7170 were purchased from the American Baldwin Locomotive Works in 1889, and were included into the numbering sequence of the six 7100 trains as numbers 7 and 8. Soon afterwards, the Horonai Railway came to be controlled by Hokuyūsha company president Murata Tsutsumi, who renamed them "First Murata" and "Second Murata" (dai-ichi and dai-ni Murata). The two were later sold off by the Meiji government, which privatized (sold) a great many government endeavors.

History
Though originally numbered 8 & 9 upon their import from the United States, the two locomotives were re-numbered 9 & 10 upon their sale by the government-controlled Horonai Railway to the Hokkaido Colliery and Railway Company in 1889. The 1906 Railway Nationalization Act then incorporated the Hokkaido Colliery and Railway Company into the Japanese Government Railways. Three years later, legislation would formalize and standardize the numbering, establishing the Class 7170 as consisting of these two locomotives, dubbed 7170 and 7171. At this time, the chimneys were altered, and the forward sections of the steam rooms expanded.

Following the nationalization of the railways, in 1920 the two were sold to the Suttsu Railways, and re-numbered No. 1 and No. 2, serving Kutchan, Muroran, Asahikawa and Hakodate. Though they served their new purpose well, and were used extensively, one of the locomotives suffered an accidental collision on July 2, 1950, and was scrapped the following year.

Construction
The tender locomotives had their maker's standard 2-6-0 (1C) axle positions. Like the 7100 series, they bore a diamond-shaped chimney and cow catcher in the older American style, but had straight-top boilers instead of wagon-top ones, and a steam-dome in the second boiler compartment. Of the tender's three axles, the second and third were bogies.

Main specifications
 Total length： 
 Total height：
 Axle positions： 2-6-0 (1C)
 Driving wheel diameter： 
 Gauge: standard Stephenson gauge, American type
 Cylinders： 
 Boiler pressure： 
 Fire lattice area： 
 Total heat area： 
 Steam： 
 Furnace： 
 Boiler capacity： 
 Smaller pipes：  (160 count)
 Locomotive operating weight： 
 Locomotive weight empty： 
 Driving wheel weight (running)： 
 Driving wheel axle weight (largest)： 
 Tender operating weight：
 Tender weight empty： 
 Water tank capacity： 
 Fuel capacity：

See also
 Japan Railways locomotive numbering and classification

References
The content represented here derives directly from the corresponding article on the Japanese Wikipedia.

Rail transport in Hokkaido
Steam locomotives of Japan
1067 mm gauge locomotives of Japan
2-6-0 locomotives
Baldwin locomotives
Freight locomotives